Ataweni Pudumaya is a 1968 Sri Lankan film directed by S. Mastan and produced by K. Gunaratnam. The film stars Joe Abeywickrama and Sandhya Kumari in lead roles whereas Clarice de Silva, Senadheera Rupasinghe and Thalatha Gunasekara made supportive roles. Music was directed by R. Muttusamy.

Cast
 Joe Abeywickrama
 Sandhya Kumari
 Clarice de Silva
 Senadheera Rupasinghe
 Thalatha Gunasekara
 D. R. Nanayakkara
 Shanthi Lekha
 Hugo Fernando
 Anthony C. Perera
 Christy Leonard Perera
 Don Sirisena
 M. V. Balan
 B. S. Perera
 Alexander Fernando
 Lilian Edirisinghe
 Richard Albert
 Roy Handapangoda
 Sunil Premadasa

References

External links
 

1968 films
1960s Sinhala-language films